is a Japanese footballer currently playing as a forward for Vanraure Hachinohe.

Career statistics

Club
.

Notes

References

1998 births
Living people
Niigata University of Health and Welfare alumni
Japanese footballers
Association football forwards
J3 League players
Vanraure Hachinohe players